JoonYong Park is a Korean web designer and developer. He currently serves as Chief Creative Officer at Firstborn, a digital agency headquartered in New York City. His past credits include campaigns for Samsung, Lowe's, Smirnoff, JetBlue, Ford, Microsoft, SoBe, M&M's, Aflac, and Kia.

Park was born in South Korea and has worked in both South Korea and the United States. He was Head of Interactive Branding at Nutility in Seoul and Creative Director at Orion Group BNM prior to joining Firstborn in 2004. He originally worked for Firstborn as a senior art director before becoming their Chief Creative Officer.

References

External links
 Firstborn
 Faculty page at the School of Visual Arts

Living people
American marketing businesspeople
Online advertising
Internet marketing people
American people of South Korean descent
Year of birth missing (living people)